Summer Breeze is the fourth album by the American soft rock band Seals and Crofts, released in 1972 through Warner Bros. Records. It was a major commercial breakthrough for the group peaking at No. 7 on the Billboard Top LPs chart, their highest position on the chart. The title track was released as a single on August 31, 1972, peaking at No. 4 on the Easy Listening chart and No. 6 on the Hot 100. "Hummingbird" was the second single, climbing to No. 12 on the Easy Listening chart, No. 20 on the Hot 100, and No. 40 on the Canadian RPM Magazine chart. Summer Breeze finished second on Billboard'''s Top Pop Albums of 1973 list.

Track listing

All lyrics by Jim Seals, music by Jim Seals and Dash Crofts, except "Say", music and lyrics by Seals and Crofts.

Side One
"Hummingbird" – 4:35
"Funny Little Man" – 3:12
"Say" – 2:41
"Summer Breeze" – 3:24
"East of Ginger Trees" – 3:49

Side Two
"Fiddle in the Sky" – 3:32
"The Boy Down the Road" – 4:31
"The Euphrates" – 4:18
"Advance Guards" – 4:12
"Yellow Dirt" – 5:14
"Summer Breeze (2004 Philip Steir Remix)" – 4:30 (2004 remastered bonus track'')

Charts

Personnel
Jim Seals – vocals, fiddle, acoustic guitar, saxophone
Dash Crofts – vocals (except on "The Euphrates"), mandolin, electric guitar, piano
Louie Shelton – electric guitar, bass, background vocals, production
Red Rhodes – steel guitar
John Hartford – banjo
Robert Lichtig – flute, clarinet, bass guitar
Jim Horn – flute
John Ford Coley – piano
Larry Knechtel – piano
Michael Lang – piano
Clarence McDonald – piano
Michael Omartian – piano
Harvey Brooks – bass
Wilton Felder – bass
Joe Osborn – bass
Jim Gordon – drums
John Guerin – drums
Jim Keltner – drums
Russ Kunkel – drums
Milt Holland – tambura, tabla
King Errisson – congas
Dee Higgins – background vocals
Don Shelton – background vocals
Marty Paich – string arrangement
Dave Hassinger – first engineer
Val Garay – second engineer
Ed Thrasher – art direction
Mark English – illustrations
Dave Bhang – album design

References

External links
Album lyrics

1972 albums
Seals and Crofts albums
Albums arranged by Marty Paich
Warner Records albums